Majlis al Shura may refer to:

 Majlis-ash-Shura, religious body regarding caliphate
 Shura Council, house of the Egyptian parliament 
Legislative Council of Brunei, Brunei's legislative body
 Consultative Assembly of Saudi Arabia
 Consultative Assembly of Oman
 Consultative Assembly of Qatar 
 Majlis-e-Shoora, Pakistan's legislative body
 Consultative Council of Bahrain house of the National Assembly of Bahrain
 Majles-e Shura-ye Eslami, parliament AKA Majlis of Iran 
 Majlis al-Shura, consultative council of Hamas